This is a list of episodes from the anime series Mobile Suit Gundam Wing, as well as the OVA Endless Waltz. The series originally aired on TV Asahi in Japan from April 7, 1995 to March 29, 1996, and later aired on Cartoon Network's Toonami programming block in the United States from March 6 to May 11, 2000.

Mobile Suit Gundam Wing

Gundam Wing: Operation Meteor
Though set immediately after the end of Gundam Wing, the original video animation (OVA) features seven clips from each Gundam pilot's perspective during the series.  Each segment is introduced and concluded with scenes depicting what has happened to the five pilots in the direct aftermath of the final battle.

Gundam Wing: Endless Waltz

References

Mobile Suit Gundam Wing
Wing
Episodes